Team Europe was an international ice hockey team created for the 2016 World Cup of Hockey. It was jointly administered by the IIHF and NHL and represented countries in Europe not represented by their own national team, including Austria, Denmark, France, Germany, Norway, Slovakia, Slovenia, and Switzerland. Team Europe players wore badges with their respective nations' flags on their jerseys.

2016 World Cup of Hockey 
Team Europe played its first pre-tournament game on September 8, 2016. They were defeated 4–0 by Team North America at the Videotron Centre, in Quebec City.

The team played 3 group stage games; a 3–0 shutout win over the United States, a 3–2 overtime win against Czech Republic, and a 4–1 defeat to Canada. Team Europe finished second in the group behind Canada and advanced to the knockout stage.

Europe faced Sweden in the semi-final where they would win 3–2 in overtime on a goal by Tomáš Tatar. In the best-of-three final against Canada, Europe was defeated, losing 3–1 and 2–1 in two games.

Team Europe finished the tournament as runners-up with a 3–3–0 record overall, scoring 11 goals and conceding 14 in six games.

Team

Roster
Roster for the 2016 World Cup of Hockey.

Head coach: Ralph Krueger

Frederik Andersen was originally selected but could not participate due to injury. He was replaced by Philipp Grubauer.

All-time record against nations

References

External links

See also
 Team Europe

Europe, Team, ice hockey
Europe, ice hockey
Europe, Team